Don Clark (born May 30, 1975) is an American musician. He was the rhythm guitarist and bassist for the Christian metal band, Demon Hunter, which he co-founded with his brother, vocalist Ryan Clark. Before Demon Hunter, Clark was a former guitarist and co-founder of Training for Utopia with Rob Dennler. He appears on Zao's The Lesser Lights of Heaven DVD.

History 
Before forming TFU and Demon Hunter, Clark was in a local band called Offset. Offset never recorded anything and was short lived.

Clark then started Training for Utopia with Rob Dennler. Clark formed the band with the Rob Dennler (vocals), Steve Saxby (bass) and Morley Boyer (drums). Dennler left the band in 1996 and Ryan joined the band. The band released an EP, a Split EP, and two studio albums.

He and his brother formed Demon Hunter in 2000 and released their debut album late the following year through Solid State Records. The group would continue to steadily gain exposure throughout the 2000s.

His grandfather, an artist, helped inspire his grandsons' work in graphic design, which is their true day job. Ryan and Don founded Seattle-based Asterik Studio with their friend Demetre Arges in 2000. The design studio has created CD packaging, poster art, web design, and/or merchandise design for hundreds of artists including Poison the Well, Liz Phair, P.O.D., and The White Stripes; however, Clark also notes that he is not a fine artist and that such work is typically outsourced. Based on their design experience, Don and Ryan authored a chapter in the book New Masters of Photoshop, Volume 2. In 2007, the brothers had announced that they were leaving Asterik to start Invisible Creature.

Clark was nominated for a Grammy Award for Best Album packaging for The Folds' Secrets Keep You Sick. He lives in Seattle, Washington, with his wife and two children.

On August 12, 2009 in Seattle, Washington, at El Corazón, Demon Hunter announced that Don Clark had left the band to pursue his career in graphic design and to be with his family.

In an interview with Matt Johnson Clark stated that, he, Don & Ryan, and Nathan Burke formed a project called Deathbed Atheist. Clark quit the band to focus on life and work.

Discography
Training for Utopia
 The Falling Cycle EP (1997)
 Plastic Soul Impalement (1998)
 Training for Utopia / Zao (1998 w/ Zao)
 Throwing a Wrench into the American Music Machine (1999)
 Technical Difficulties (2004)
Demon Hunter
 Demon Hunter (2002)
 Summer of Darkness (2004)
 The Triptych (2006)
 Storm the Gates of Hell (2007)

References 

Living people
1975 births
American performers of Christian music
American heavy metal guitarists
Musicians from San Jose, California
Solid State Records artists
Christian metal musicians
Guitarists from California
American male guitarists
21st-century American guitarists
21st-century American male musicians
Demon Hunter members